Synodontis vaillanti is a species of upside-down catfish endemic to the Central African Republic, where it is known only from the upper Ubangui River in the central Congo River basin. This species grows to a length of  TL.

It was first described by George Albert Boulenger in 1897.

References

External links 

vaillanti
Freshwater fish of Africa
Fish of the Central African Republic
Endemic fauna of the Central African Republic
Taxa named by George Albert Boulenger
Fish described in 1897